Þingeyjarsveit is a municipality located in Iceland. The Vaglaskógur birch wood, one of Iceland's largest woods, is located in the municipality. The district school and sports centre can be found in Laugar. In 2022 the municipality merged with Skútustaðahreppur under its own name. The municipality agreed to change their governance from a mayor to a council.

References

External links
Official website 

Municipalities of Iceland
Northeastern Region (Iceland)